Nowhere to Hide may refer to:

In film:
 Nowhere to Hide (1977 film), a television film starring Lee Van Cleef and Tony Musante
 Nowhere to Hide (1987 film), a film starring Amy Madigan and Daniel Hugh Kelly
 Nowhere to Hide (1994 film), a TV movie starring Rosanna Arquette and Scott Bakula
 Nowhere to Hide (1999 film), a South Korean film directed by Lee Myung-se
 Nowhere to Hide (2009 film), a film starring Meredith Monroe and Brian Dietzen
 Nowhere to Hide (2016 film), a documentary film directed by Zaradasht Ahmed

In television episodes:
 "Nowhere to Hide" (All Saints)
 "Nowhere to Hide" (Australia's Next Top Model)
 "Nowhere to Hide" (Dark Justice)
 "Nowhere to Hide" (McLeod's Daughters)
 "Nowhere to Hide" (My Secret Identity)

In music:
 Nowhere to Hide (album), and album by The Virus
 "Nowhere to Hide", a Trampled by Turtles song from the album Blue Sky and the Devil
 "Nowhere to Hide", a song by Antiloop from their 1997 LP
 "Nowhere to Hide" (Crobot song)

See also
 Kyle XY: Nowhere to Hide, an original novel based on the ABC Family series
 No Place to Hide (disambiguation)